Telipna consanguinea is a butterfly in the family Lycaenidae. It is found in Cameroon, the Central African Republic, the Democratic Republic of the Congo, Uganda and Tanzania. The habitat consists of forests.

The larvae feed on lichens and mosses growing on the bark of trees. They are greenish or bluish brown with fine darker lines and reach a length of about 30 mm.

Subspecies
Telipna consanguinea consanguinea (Cameroon, Central African Republic, Democratic Republic of the Congo, Uganda)
Telipna consanguinea ugandae Behune-Baker, 1926 (Uganda, Tanzania)

References

Butterflies described in 1914
Poritiinae
Taxa named by Hans Rebel